The 2010 Colchester Borough Council election took place on 6 May 2010 to elect members of Colchester Borough Council in Essex, England. One third of the council was up for election and the council stayed under no overall control.

After the election, the composition of the council was
Liberal Democrats 26
Conservative 24
Labour 7
Independent 3

Election result
The Liberal Democrats became the largest party on the council with 26 seats after taking 3 seats from the Conservatives. The gains came in Berechurch and Mile End wards where the sitting councillors were not defending the seats, as well as Stanway where Conservative councillor Gaye Pyman was defeated by 265 votes. This dropped the Conservatives to 24 seats, while Labour stayed on 7 seats and there remained 3 independents. Overall turnout at the election was 65.3%, ranging from a high of 74.6% in Pyefleet to a low of 47.9% in St Andrew's ward.

Following the election the coalition between the Liberal Democrats, Labour and independents remained in control of the council administration.

Ward results

Berechurch

Birch & Winstree

Castle

Christ Church

Fordham & Stour

Harbour

Highwoods

Lexden

Mile End

New Town

Prettygate

Pyefleet

St. Andrew's

St. Anne's

St. John's

Shrub End

Stanway

Tiptree

West Bergholt & Eight Ash Green

West Mersea

References

2010 English local elections
May 2010 events in the United Kingdom
2010
2010s in Essex